Cyperus subcaracasanus is a species of sedge that is endemic to parts of central Africa.

The species was first formally described by the botanist Georg Kükenthal in 1936.

See also
 List of Cyperus species

References

submicrolepis
Taxa named by Georg Kükenthal
Plants described in 1936
Flora of Angola
Flora of Benin
Flora of Chad
Flora of Guinea
Flora of Mali
Flora of Ivory Coast
Flora of Niger
Flora of Nigeria
Flora of Senegal
Flora of Sudan
Flora of Uganda